Koeru Parish was a rural municipality in Järva County, Estonia.

Settlements
1 small borough: Koeru.

26 villages: Abaja, Aruküla,  Ervita, Jõeküla, Kalitsa, Kapu, Koidu-Ellavere, Kuusna, Laaneotsa, Liusvere, Merja, Norra, Preedi, Puhmu, Rõhu, Salutaguse, Santovi, Tammiku, Tudre, Udeva, Vahuküla, Väinjärve, Valila, Vao, Visusti and Vuti.

See also
Koeru TV Mast
Endla Nature Reserve

References

External links
 

 
Populated places in Järva County